This is a list of episodes for @midnight that aired in 2015. In 2015 the show started taping from a new set, and the title was extended from @midnight to @midnight with Chris Hardwick.

2015

January
The first two weeks aired at an earlier time at 11:30 p.m. (EST), following The Daily Show, until the premiere of The Nightly Show with Larry Wilmore on January 19, 2015.

February

March

April

May

June

July

August

September
The first three weeks aired at an earlier at 11:00 p.m. (EST), until the premiere of The Daily Show with Trevor Noah on September 28. The final week of the time shift, designated "Bunches of Funches," is four consecutive new episodes featuring frequent winner Ron Funches.

October

November

December

References

External links
 
 

2015 American television seasons